The 2018–19 DEL2 season was the sixth season since the founding of the DEL2, the second tier of German ice hockey, set below the Deutsche Eishockey Liga. The season ran from 14 September 2018 till 28 April 2019. Löwen Frankfurt was crowned league premiers by finishing top of the regular season standings. Ravensburg Towerstars caused an upset by claiming the championship title by defeating Löwen Frankfurt 4-2 in the final series. Promoted team, Deggendorfer SC, was unable to survive in DEL2 and was relegated after losing the relegation playoffs final 3-4 against Wölfe Freiburg.

Modus

Fourteen teams competed in the 2018–19 DEL2 regular season. Deggendorfer SC was promoted from Germany's third division, Oberliga. Each team played each other twice in the regular season, home and away, for a total of 52 matches each. The top six teams directly qualified for the championship playoffs, played in a best of seven format. Teams placed seven to ten advanced to the championship playoff qualifiers, which follow a best of three format. The bottom four teams enter the relegation playoffs. The two losing teams from round 1 face off in the relegation final with the losing team being relegated to Oberliga.

The DEL2 champion does not automatically get promoted to DEL. In September 2015, the DEL and DEL2 agreed to reintroduce promotion and relegation between the two leagues from the 2017–18 season onwards. The DEL2 champion would then have the opportunity to be promoted, provided it fulfilled the licensing requirements of the DEL, while the last-placed DEL club would be relegated. In 2018, the two leagues signed a new agreement to reintroduce an automatic promotion and relegation system to start in 2020–21.

Regular season

Results

The cross table represents the results of all matches of the regular season. The home team is listed in the middle column, the visiting team in the top row.

Note: O Overtime; S Shootout

Standings

Points rules: 3 points for regulation win; 2 points for OT or SO win; 1 point for OT or SO loss; 0 points for regulation loss 
Tie-break rules: 1) points; 2) head-to-head points; 3) head-to-head goal difference; 4) head-to-head number of goals scored. 
(C) Champions; (P) Premiers; (R) Relegated 
Source:

Top scorers

Source:

Top goaltenders

Note: To qualify for this list, goaltenders need to have played a minimum of 20 matches 
Source:

Playoffs

Championship
The championship play-offs:

The qualifiers for the playoffs ran between 8 March 2019 to 12 March 2019. Four teams (7v10 and 8v9) competed in best of three series’. The two winning teams advanced to the championship playoffs. In 2019, the two lower ranked teams in the qualifiers, Dresdner Eislöwen and ETC Crimmitschau, won their series and advanced to the playoffs. Kassel Huskies and Heilbronner Falken were knocked out and their season ended.

The championship playoffs ran between 15 March 2019 to 28 April 2019. Eight teams competed in best of seven series'. The series winning teams advanced through from the quarter-finals to the final. In 2019, the top seed Löwen Frankfurt dominated their quarter and semi-finals to reach the final. However, they lost the final series 4-2 to third seed Ravensburg Towerstars. The Towerstars claimed their second division 2 championship and their first DEL2 championship trophy.

Note: All numbers represent series results, not a match score

Relegation
The relegation play-offs:

The relegation playoffs is contested between the four teams who finish bottom of the regular season standings. Run between 15 March 2019 and 16 April 2019, the four teams play best of seven series’. The teams that lose their first round advance to the second round. The winners secure their DEL2 status and avoid relegation. Whoever loses the second round is relegated to Oberliga. The 2019 edition saw Deggendorfer SC relegated to Oberliga after losing their first round series 4-0 against Bayreuth Tigers before going to the wire but ultimately losing the seventh match against Wölfe Freiburg in the second round.

Note: All numbers represent series results, not a match score

References

External links

 Official website
 Official Facebook
 Elite Prospects home

2018–19 in European second tier ice hockey leagues
2018-19 DEL2
2018–19 in German ice hockey